Senator Vare may refer to:

Flora M. Vare (1874–1962), Pennsylvania State Senate
William Scott Vare (1867–1934), Pennsylvania State Senate